Earl E. Lorden (1896 – September 2, 1984) was an American college baseball coach and player. Lorden was the head baseball coach of the University of Massachusetts Amherst. Lorden played college baseball at the University of New Hampshire.

Coaching career

Head coaching record

References

External links
Earl Lorden Field at The Baseball Cube

UMass Minutemen baseball coaches
1896 births
1984 deaths
New Hampshire Wildcats baseball players